Ali Hussain Rizvi (Urdu: علی حسین رضوی) (born January 6, 1974, Karachi) is a former Pakistani cricketer who played in one Test in 1997. A leg spin bowler, he took two wickets in his only appearance. 

1974 births
Living people
Cricketers from Karachi
Pakistan Test cricketers
Pakistani cricketers
Karachi Whites cricketers
Karachi Blues cricketers
Pakistan Customs cricketers
Karachi cricketers